Ecton railway station was a station on the Leek and Manifold Light Railway. It served the hamlet of Ecton, Staffordshire. Today, the site is now part of the Manifold Way between Hulme End and Waterhouses.

Route

References

Disused railway stations in Staffordshire
Railway stations opened in 1904
Railway stations closed in 1934
1904 establishments in England
1934 disestablishments in England
Former Leek and Manifold Light Railway stations
Railway stations in Great Britain opened in the 20th century